Sweethearts or Strangers is the debut album by country music singer Faron Young.

Track listing

References

1957 debut albums
Faron Young albums